Gangs of London may refer to:

Gangs of London (TV series), a 2020 British-American TV series
Gangs of London (video game), a 2006 game for the Sony PSP

See also
Gangs in London, real-life criminal activity in the UK capital
Organized crime in London, Ontario